National League of Cities v. Usery, 426 U.S. 833 (1976), was a case in which the Supreme Court of the United States held that the Fair Labor Standards Act could not constitutionally be applied to state governments. The decision was overruled by the U.S. Supreme Court in Garcia v. San Antonio Metropolitan Transit Authority.

Background 
This case involved a dispute concerning the extent of the U.S. federal government’s Commerce Clause power to regulate the activities of the states.

The Fair Labor Standards Act (FLSA), which was upheld in United States v. Darby Lumber Co., was later amended to remove state exemptions pertaining to employees of state institutions. The FLSA imposed on all public employers certain minimum wage standards and maximum work hours limitations. Those limitations had previously been restricted to those individual businesses and private employees engaged in interstate commerce. After the amendment, the FLSA applied equally to all state employees including those in hospitals and schools which are areas typically thought to be outside the penumbra of "interstate commerce" regulatory powers.

The U.S. Supreme Court granted certiorari, and the question presented was whether the Tenth Amendment barred Congress from exercising its commerce powers to regulate wages, hours, and benefits of State employees, when doing so is a power traditionally reserved to states.

Rehnquist's majority opinion 
Relying on language from Heart of Atlanta Motel v. United States, Justice William Rehnquist, writing for the majority, acknowledged that Congress may exercise power over private endeavors even when doing so preempts state law so long as the means chosen are reasonably adapted to the legitimate ends.  However, the Court distinguished the case from Darby, explaining that the 10th amendment declares that Congress cannot exercise its power so as to impair the states' integrity or their ability to function effectively in a federal system. Congress may have the authority to regulate individual businesses under the Commerce Clause, but in this case they are regulating not just individuals, but the "States as States." Additionally, the Court recognized that while Congress may have the affirmative authority under the Commerce Clause to reach the matter, the Constitution prohibits Federal regulation of that matter. The Court concluded that determinations of state employee wages, and compensations, as well as the hours they may work, are "functions essential to separate and independent existence," and that those functions are state plenary powers protected from Congressional infringement. To allow otherwise, the majority reasoned, would be to neglect the federal system of government embodied by the Constitution.

The majority abandoned the reasoning applied in Maryland v. Wirtz and cited the fears of unchecked power expressed by Justice Douglas in his dissent. The majority also mentioned that the FLSA's requirements would force states to restructure many of their existing policies, and would result in a substantial cost burden.

Blackmun's concurrence 
Justice Harry Blackmun's interpretation of the majority view was that it advocated the courts to use a balancing approach that weighed the importance of the government’s interest with how essential the state functions are to the state’s separate and independent existence.

Blackmun was later the swing justice who switched sides and helped overturn the case, asserting that the "traditional government functions" test he had previously supported had proved "unworkable."

See also
 List of United States Supreme Court cases, volume 426

References

External links

1976 in United States case law
Overruled United States Supreme Court decisions
United States Supreme Court cases
United States Supreme Court cases of the Burger Court
United States public employment case law
United States Tenth Amendment case law
Minimum wage law